Domenico Leccisi (20 May 19202 November 2008) was an Italian politician, who is best known for stealing the corpse of the fascist dictator Benito Mussolini from an unmarked grave in 1946.

Grave robbing incident
On the eve of the first anniversary of Italy's liberation from Nazi occupying forces, Leccisi, then a right-wing journalist, and two helpers dug up the corpse from the city's Musocco cemetery and spirited it away.

Leccisi left behind a note that said: "Finally, O Duce, you are with us. We will cover you with roses but the smell of your virtue will overpower those roses."

Authorities discovered Mussolini's remains four months later, hidden at a 15th-century monastery at Pavia south of Milan. Two monks were charged with hiding the body.

In 1957 Mussolini found a final resting place at his birthplace in Predappio, northern Italy, after a campaign led by Leccisi and his party.

Political career
Leccisi served as a parliamentary deputy for the neo-fascist Italian Social Movement from 1953 to 1963. He was also a Milan city councillor and wrote an autobiography, With Mussolini Before and After Piazzale Loreto.

Death
Leccisi died at age 88 on 2 November 2008 at a retirement home in Milan due to heart and respiratory disease.

References

1920 births
2008 deaths
People from Molfetta
Italian Social Movement politicians
People of the Italian Social Republic
Respiratory disease deaths in Lombardy
20th-century Italian politicians